Ricardo José Ribeiro Berzoini (born 10 February 1960 in Juiz de Fora, Brazil) was the President of the Workers' Party of Brazil from 2005 to 2010. He has served as minister for social security.

From January 1, 2015, to October 2, 2015, he served as Minister of Communications.

References

|-

|-

|-

|-

|-

1960 births
Living people
Brazilian people of Italian descent
People from Juiz de Fora
Presidents of the Workers' Party (Brazil)
Workers' Party (Brazil) politicians
Government ministers of Brazil